The television series Can't Buy Me Love ran for 32 episodes and was broadcast on TVB Jade in the third line series. The synopsis is according to Singapore's MediaCorp Channel 8's synopsis, with little name alterations.

Episodic Synopsis

See also
List of TVB dramas in 2010
Can't Buy Me Love

Can't Buy Me Love
Can't Buy Me Love